= Kimtadi =

Village in Mahakali, Nepal

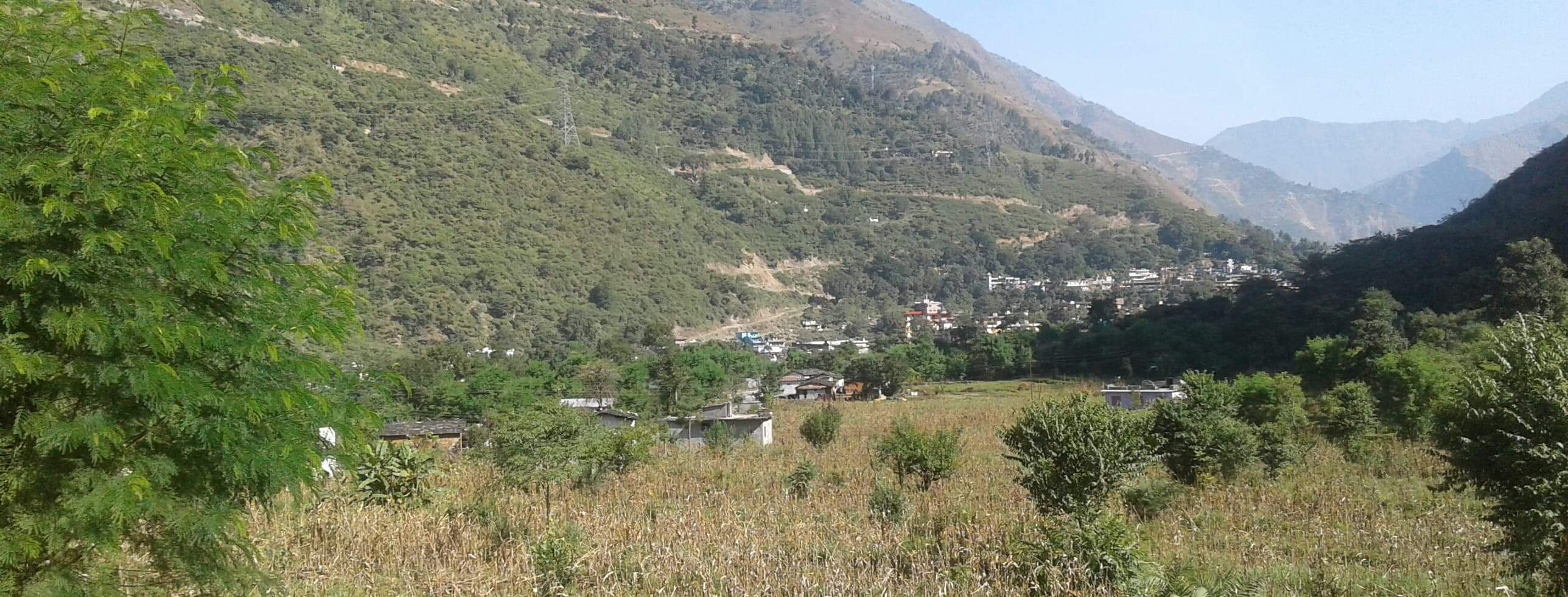
Kimtadi Village

Kimtadi (किम्तडी) is a village located in Mahakali municipality 5, Nepal. It mainly consists of Chhetri and Bahun caste.
